Prunus polytricha (hairy cherry, or 多毛野樱桃, hairy wild cherry) is a species of cherry native to Gansu, Guizhou, Henan, Hubei, Shaanxi and Sichuan provinces of China, typically found at 1100–3300m above sea level. It is a shrub or low tree typically 2–12m tall and prefers mesic hills and forest edges. It is found in old growth oak forests and in semi-cultivation in windbreaks. Its buds, leaves and seeds are consumed by the golden snub-nosed monkey (Rhinopithecus roxellana).

References

External links

polytricha
Cherries
Endemic flora of China
Flora of North-Central China
Flora of South-Central China
Flora of Southeast China
Plants described in 1912